The S&P Europe 350 Index is a stock index of European stocks.

It is a part of the S&P Global 1200.   The constituent shares are selected for relevance to the broad market, including industry sector balance, longevity (to minimize index turnover) and liquidity of the shares.

Investment

This index is tracked by an exchange-traded fund, IShares Europe. Other funds track the FTSE Developed Europe or euro-based indices such as MSCI EMU. In Europe more funds are based on Stoxx Europe 50.

See also
STOXX Europe 50
S&P Europe 350 Dividend Aristocrats
S&P 500
STOXX Europe 600

References

External links
S&P page on S&P Europe 350

Pan-European stock market indices
Europe 350